The Dominion of Pakistan, officially Pakistan, was an independent federal dominion in the Commonwealth of Nations, existing between 14 August 1947 and 23 March 1956, created by the passing of the Indian Independence Act 1947 by the British parliament, which also created an independent Dominion of India.  

Before its independence, Pakistan consisted of those Presidencies and provinces of British India which were allocated to it in the Partition of India. Until 1947, they had been ruled by the United Kingdom as a part of the British Empire. 

During the year that followed its independence, the new country was joined by the Princely states of Pakistan ruled by princes who had previously been in subsidiary alliances with the British, which acceded to Pakistan, one by one, with their rulers signing Instruments of Accession. For many years, these states enjoyed a special status within the dominion and later the republic, but they were slowly incorporated into the provinces. The last remnants of their internal self-government had been lost by 1974. 

Initially, the Dominion of Pakistan had two wings, one in the East, which is now Bangladesh, and another in the West, which is now Pakistan. After the Constitution of Pakistan of 1956 came into effect, the Pakistani monarchy was abolished, when the Islamic Republic of Pakistan was proclaimed.

The status as a federal dominion within the British Empire ended in 1956 with the completion of the Constitution of Pakistan, which established the country as a republic. The constitution also administratively split the nation into West Pakistan and East Pakistan, which were until then governed as a singular entity,  despite being separate geographic exclaves. In 1971 following the Indo-Pakistani War of 1971, East Pakistan seceded as the new nation of Bangladesh, whereas West Pakistan became Pakistan.

History

Partition and independence

Section 1 of the Indian Independence Act 1947 provided that from "the fifteenth day of August, nineteen hundred and forty-seven, two independent dominions shall be set up in India, to be known respectively as India and Pakistan."  The British monarch became the head of state of both the new dominions, with Pakistan sharing a king with the United Kingdom and the other dominions of the British Commonwealth, and the monarch's constitutional roles in Pakistan were delegated to the Governor-General of Pakistan.

Before August 1947, about half of the area of present-day Pakistan was part of British India, which was directly governed by the British in the name of the British Crown, while the remainder were princely states in subsidiary alliances with the British, enjoying semi-autonomous self-government. The British abandoned these alliances in August 1947, leaving the states entirely independent, and between 1947 and 1948 the states all acceded to Pakistan, while retaining internal self-government for several years.

More than ten million people migrated across the new borders and between 200,000–2,000,000 people died in the spate of communal violence in the Punjab in what some scholars have described as a 'retributive genocide' between the religions. The Pakistani government claimed that 50,000 Muslim women were abducted and raped by Hindu and Sikh men and similarly the Indian government claimed that Muslims abducted and raped 33,000 Hindu and Sikh women. The two governments agreed to repatriate abducted women and thousands of Hindu, Sikh and Muslim women were repatriated to their families in the 1950s. The dispute over Kashmir escalated into the first war between India and Pakistan. With the assistance of the United Nations (UN) the war was ended but it became the Kashmir dispute, unresolved .

In 1947, the founding fathers of Pakistan agreed to appoint Liaquat Ali Khan as the country's first prime minister, with Muhammad Ali Jinnah as both first governor-general and speaker of the State Parliament. Mountbatten had offered to serve as Governor-general of both India and Pakistan but Jinnah refused this offer.

The first formal step to transform Pakistan into an ideological Islamic state was taken in March 1949 when Liaquat Ali Khan introduced the Objectives Resolution in the Constituent Assembly. The Objectives Resolution declared that sovereignty over the entire universe belongs to Allah. Support for the Objectives Resolution and the transformation of Pakistan into an Islamic state was led by Maulana Shabbir Ahmad Usmani, a respected Deobandi alim (scholar) who occupied the position of Shaykh al-Islam in Pakistan in 1949, and Maulana Mawdudi of Jamaat-i Islami.

Indian Muslims from the United Provinces, Bombay Province, Central Provinces and other areas of India continued migrating to Pakistan throughout the 1950 and 1960s and settled mainly in urban Sindh, particularly in the new country's first capital, Karachi. Prime Minister Ali Khan established a strong government and had to face challenges soon after gaining the office. His Finance Secretary Victor Turner announced the country's first monetary policy by establishing the State Bank, the Federal Bureau of Statistics and the Federal Board of Revenue to improve statistical knowledge, finance, taxation, and revenue collection in the country. There were also problems because India cut off water supply to Pakistan from two canal headworks in its side of Punjab on 1 April 1948 and also withheld delivering Pakistan its share of the assets and funds of United India, which the Indian government released after Gandhi's pressurisation.

Political unrest

In a 1948 speech, Jinnah declared that "Urdu alone would be the state language and the lingua franca of the Pakistan state", although at the same time he called for the Bengali language to be the official language of the Bengal province. Nonetheless, tensions began to grow in East Bengal. Jinnah's health further deteriorated and he died in 1948. Bengali leader, Sir Khawaja Nazimuddin succeeded as the governor general of Pakistan.

During a massive political rally in 1951, Prime Minister Ali Khan was assassinated, and Nazimuddin became the second prime minister. Tensions in East Pakistan reached a climax in 1952, when the East Pakistani police opened fire on students protesting for the Bengali language to receive equal status with Urdu. The situation was controlled by Nazimuddin who issued a waiver granting the Bengali language equal status, a right codified in the 1956 constitution. In 1953 at the instigation of religious parties, anti-Ahmadiyya riots erupted, which led to many Ahmadi deaths. The riots were investigated by a two-member court of inquiry in 1954, which was criticised by the Jamaat-e-Islami, one of the parties accused of inciting the riots. This event led to the first instance of martial law in the country and began the history of military intervention into the politics and civilian affairs of the country. In 1954 the controversial One Unit Program was imposed by the last Pakistan Muslim League (PML) Prime minister Ali Bogra dividing Pakistan on the German geopolitical model.  The same year the first legislative elections were held in Pakistan, which saw the communists gaining control of East Pakistan. The 1954 election results clarified the differences in ideology between West and East Pakistan, with East Pakistan under the influence of the Communist Party allying with the Shramik Krishak Samajbadi Dal (Workers Party) and the Awami League. The pro-American Republican Party gained a majority in West Pakistan, ousting the PML government. After a vote of confidence in Parliament and the promulgation of the 1956 constitution, which confirmed Pakistan as an Islamic republic, two notable figures became prime minister and president, as the first Bengali leaders of the country. Huseyn Suhrawardy became the prime minister leading a communist-socialist alliance, and Iskander Mirza became the first president of Pakistan.

Radcliffe Line and territory

The dominion began as a federation of five provinces: East Bengal (later to become Bangladesh), West Punjab, Balochistan, Sindh, and the North-West Frontier Province (NWFP).  Each province had its own governor, who was appointed by the Governor-General of Pakistan. In addition, over the following year the princely states of Pakistan, which covered a significant area of West Pakistan, acceded to Pakistan. They included Bahawalpur, Khairpur, Swat, Dir, Chitral, and the Khanate of Kalat.

The controversial Radcliffe Award, not published until 17 August 1947 specified the Radcliffe Line which demarcated the border between the parts of British India allocated to the two new independent dominions of India and Pakistan. The Radcliffe Boundary Commission sought to separate the Muslim-majority regions in the east and northwest from the areas with a Hindu majority. This entailed the partition of two British provinces which did not have a uniform majority — Bengal and Punjab. The western part of Punjab became the Pakistani province of Punjab and the eastern part became the Indian state of Punjab. Bengal was similarly divided into East Bengal (in Pakistan) and West Bengal (in India).

Monarchy and the Commonwealth

Under the Indian Independence Act 1947, British India was to be divided into the independent sovereign states of India and Pakistan. From 1947 to 1952, George VI was the sovereign of Pakistan, which shared the same person as its sovereign with the United Kingdom and the other Dominions in the British Commonwealth of Nations.

Following George VI's death on 6 February 1952, his elder daughter Princess Elizabeth, who was in Kenya at that time, became the new monarch of Pakistan. During the Queen's coronation in 1953, Elizabeth II was crowned as Queen of seven independent Commonwealth countries, including Pakistan. In her Coronation Oath, the new Queen promised "to govern the Peoples of ... Pakistan ... according to their respective laws and customs". The Standard of Pakistan at the Coronation was borne by Mirza Abol Hassan Ispahani.

Pakistan abolished the monarchy on the adoption of a republican constitution on 23 March 1956. However, Pakistan became a republic within the Commonwealth of Nations. The Queen sent a message to President Mirza which said, "I have followed with close interest the progress of your country since its establishment ... It is a source of great satisfaction to me to know that your country intends to remain within the Commonwealth. I am confident that Pakistan and other countries of the Commonwealth will continue to thrive and to benefit from their mutual association".

Foreign relations

Territorial problems arose with neighbouring Afghanistan over the Pakistan–Afghanistan border in 1949, and with India over the Line of Control in Kashmir. Diplomatic recognition became a problem when the Soviet Union led by Joseph Stalin did not welcome the partition which established Pakistan and India. The Imperial State of Iran was the first country to recognise Pakistan in 1947.  In 1948, Ben-Gurion of Israel sent a secret courier to Jinnah to establish the diplomatic relations, but Jinnah did not give any response to Ben-Gurion.

After gaining Independence, Pakistan vigorously pursued bilateral relations with other Muslim countries and made a wholehearted bid for leadership of the Muslim world, or at least for leadership in achieving its unity. The Ali brothers had sought to project Pakistan as the natural leader of the Islamic world, in large part due to its large population and military strength. A top ranking Muslim League leader, Khaliquzzaman, declared that Pakistan would bring together all Muslim countries into Islamistan – a pan-Islamic entity. The USA, which did not approve of Pakistan's creation, was against this idea and British Prime Minister Clement Attlee voiced international opinion at the time by stating that he wished that India and Pakistan would re-unite, as opposed to the hoped-for unity of Muslim World. Since most of the Arab world was undergoing a nationalist awakening at the time, there was little attraction in Pakistan's pan-Islamic aspirations. Some of the Arab countries saw the 'Islamistan' project as a Pakistani attempt to dominate other Muslim states. Pakistan vigorously championed the right of self-determination for Muslims around the world. Pakistan's efforts for the independence movements of Indonesia, Algeria, Tunisia, Morocco and Eritrea were significant and initially led to close ties between these countries and Pakistan.

List of heads of state

Monarchs
From 1947 to 1956, Pakistan was a constitutional monarchy. The Pakistani monarch was the same person as the sovereign of the nations in the British Commonwealth of Nations.

Governors-General

The Governor-General was the representative of the monarch in the Dominion of Pakistan.

See also
Princely states of Pakistan

Notes

References

Further reading
 Chester, Lucy P. (2009) Borders and Conflict in South Asia: The Radcliffe Boundary Commission and the Partition of Punjab. Manchester: Manchester University Press.
 Read, A. and Fisher, D. (1997). The Proudest Day: India's Long Road to Independence. New York: Norton.

Pakistan
Former countries in South Asia
Muhammad Ali Jinnah
Pakistan and the Commonwealth of Nations
Monarchy
Partition of India
Politics of Pakistan
States and territories established in 1947
1947 establishments in Pakistan
1956 disestablishments in Pakistan